Don Segundo Sombra is a 1926 novel by Argentine rancher Ricardo Güiraldes. Like José Hernández's poem Martín Fierro, its protagonist is a gaucho. However, unlike Hernandez's poem, Don Segundo Sombra does not romanticize the figure of the gaucho, but simply examines the character as a shadow (sombra) cast across Argentine history.

Unlike the character of Martin Fierro, who is purely a fictional creation, Don Segundo Sombra was loosely based and inspired by the real life of Segundo Ramírez, a native of the town of San Antonio de Areco, in Buenos Aires Province. The novel made it to the big screen in the 1969 Argentine film of the same name, directed by Manuel Antín.

Ricardo Güiraldes, who was a friend and literary partner of Jorge Luis Borges –they both founded the legendary magazine Proa –, managed to develop a simple and modern language for the novel: a high quality mixture of literacy and colourful local expressions that earned him a major standing among the best representatives of "criollismo".

Even though it may be considered as having a continuity of sorts with '"Martin Fierro"', the protagonist is more than an extinguished gaucho elegy (like José Hernández's character is); instead, Don Segundo Sombra was designed to present (or propose) a series of new ethical examples to a youth that Güiraldes considered disoriented and restless during his time.

References

External links
 
 

1926 Argentine novels
Argentine novels adapted into films
Sombra
Sombra
Novels set in Argentina